Sumgayit Technologies Park launched in 2009, is the first Technology Park of its kind in Azerbaijan and the South Caucasus region. The park is located in Hacı Zeynalabdin settlement, north of Sumgait city.

About
STP was launched by the President of Azerbaijan, Ilham Aliyev on 22 December 2009. It was the first technology park to operate under market conditions in Azerbaijan.

More than 2000 people are currently employed in the production and construction-installation fields of the organization, and after the launch of all planned plants, 10,000 more people are expected to be employed.

Products manufactured at STP include electrical equipment, cables, machine building, polymeric products, steel fabrication, hot-dip galvanizing, sandwich panels,  ventilation systems, polyvinyl chloride windows, technical cases, solar panels, payment terminals and  powder coating.

In January 2021, Ruslan Aghabeyli was appointed as a chief executive director.

in 2020, Sumgayit Technology Park made a change in business and management form in order to adapt quickly to changes in the management and industrial sector and customers needs. The company has moved from a manufacturing entity to a head office and management body. The existing factories and production areas have been merged into newly established business units and joint ventures.

STP Business Units:

 · STP Global Cable
 · STP Aluminum
 · STP Metal Structures

STP joint ventures:

 · SOCAR-STP
 · STP AH
 · Assan STP Panel

Products manufactured by STP's business units and joint ventures include electrical equipment, cables, mechanical engineering, polymer products, steel production, sandwich panels, ventilation systems, polyvinyl chloride windows, hot-dip galvanizing, technical boxes, solar panels and powder coatings.

Gallery

References

External links 

Buildings and structures in Azerbaijan
2009 establishments in Azerbaijan
Azerbaijani companies established in 2009
Economy of Azerbaijan